Bissy may refer to:

"de Bissy" family
Cola acuminata